Flint Hill is an unincorporated community in Ralls County, in the U.S. state of Missouri. The community lies on Camp Creek approximately one-half mile north of the Salt River. US Route 61 passes 1.5 miles to the west along Missouri Route O.

History
The community once had a Baptist church and a schoolhouse, both of which are now defunct.  The area was named was so named for the flint rock hill upon which the church stood.

References

Unincorporated communities in Ralls County, Missouri
Unincorporated communities in Missouri